is a former Japanese football player. She played for Japan national team.

Club career
Takashima played for L.League club Nissan FC. She was selected Fighting Spirit prize in 1993 season. However, the club was disbanded in 1993. She moved to Shiroki FC Serena in 1994.

National team career
On August 21, 1994, Takashima debuted for Japan national team against Austria.

National team statistics

References

Year of birth missing (living people)
Living people
Japanese women's footballers
Japan women's international footballers
Nadeshiko League players
Nissan FC Ladies players
Shiroki FC Serena players
Women's association football forwards